The Lady and Mr. Johnson is a blues album by Rory Block consisting of songs written by Robert Johnson. It was released on 15 August 2006, through Rykodisc.

Track listing 
"Cross Road Blues" (Johnson) – 3:19
"Preaching Blues (Up Jumped the Devil)" (Johnson) – 3:04
"Milkcow's Calf Blues" (Johnson) – 2:29
"Walking Blues" (Johnson) – 2:44
"32-20 Blues" (Johnson) – 4:15
"Rambling on My Mind" (Johnson) – 2:59
"Terraplane Blues" (Johnson) – 3:21
"Me and the Devil Blues" (Johnson) – 3:17
"Last Fair Deal Gone Down" (Johnson) – 3:22
"Come in My Kitchen" (Johnson) – 3:09
"Hellhound on My Trail" (Johnson) – 2:48
"If I Had Possession over Judgement Day" (Johnson) – 2:49
"Kind Hearted Woman Blues" (Johnson) – 3:11

2006 albums
Rory Block albums
Rykodisc albums
Tribute albums
Robert Johnson